The men's 3,000 metres steeplechase event at the 1980 Summer Olympics took place from 26 to 31 July at the Lenin Stadium. A total of 32 athletes competed, with three qualifying heats (32 runners) and two semi-finals (24) before the final (12).

Summary
As the previous Olympic final in Montreal had been in 1976, also this Olympic steeplechase final was quick from the start.  In accordance with most pre-final expectations, Tanzania's Filbert Bayi sprinted to the lead soon after the start.  With Ethiopia's Eshetu Tura and Spain's Francisco Sanchez following him, Bayi led the 12-man field through 1,000 metres in 2:38.4.  During the second kilometre of this final, several runners gradually lost contact with the top steeplechasers.  Already with four laps to go, Bayi had stretched his lead over Tura to 10 metres. With three laps to go, Bayi had expanded his lead to at least 20 metres.  However, around that point, Poland's Bronislaw Malinowski moved into the third place.  By the time Bayi passed 2,000 metres in 5:20.3, he started to tire out.  His fatigue became visible with two laps to go, when he still held a 35-metre lead over Tura.  As a result, he needed to stretch and strain his tired legs more and more, in order to jump over the barriers.  By contrast, Malinowski kept jumping over the barriers smoothly and effortlessly.  During the second-last lap, Malinowski passed Tura, and started to close in on Bayi.  Although the Tanzanian was still around 20 metres ahead of the Pole at the start of the final lap, Bayi's speed had visibly slowed down.  It was only a matter of time before Malinowski would catch and pass him.  On the final bend, shortly before the last water barrier, Malinowski at last sprinted past the exhausted Bayi.  The experienced Polish steeplechaser easily won the race, while Bayi was able to keep Tura behind himself.  Spain's Domingo Ramon placed fourth, as this final's best Western European.  (The Olympic Book of Moscow (The Runner Magazine), Helsinki, Finland, 1980;  The Big Olympic Book (the 1980 edition), Helsinki, Finland;  https://www.youtube.com/watch?v=8xbEsKKDyNQ.)

Records
Prior to this competition, the existing world, and Olympic records were as follows.

The following national records were established during the competition:

Schedule
The men's 3000 metres steeplechase took place over three separate days.

All times are Moscow Time (UTC+3)

Results

Heats
Note: Top six in each heat (Q) and the next six fastest (q) advanced to the semi-finals.

Heat 1

Heat 2

Heat 3

Semi-finals
Note: Top four in each heat (Q) and the next four fastest (q) advanced to the final.

Semi-final 1

Semi-final 2

Final

See also
 1976 Men's Olympic 3000 m Steeplechase (Montreal)
 1978 Men's European Championships 3000 m Steeplechase (Prague)
 1982 Men's European Championships 3000 m Steeplechase (Athens)
 1983 Men's World Championships 3000 m Steeplechase (Helsinki)
 1984 Men's Olympic 3000 m Steeplechase (Los Angeles)
 1986 Men's European Championships 3000 m Steeplechase (Stuttgart)

References

External links
 Results
Event overview at Olympedia.org

Men's 3000 metres steeplechase
1980
Men's events at the 1980 Summer Olympics